Monastic houses in the Kingdom of Hungary include abbeys, priories and friaries, among other monastic religious houses.

List of monastic houses in Hungary

Literature
 Topor, István : Szerzetesek és szerzetesrendek Magyarországon
 Siska, József : Premontrei szerzetesek a bodrogközi Leleszen

References

Monastic houses
Christian monasteries in Hungary